Senator Gilchrist may refer to:

Alfred J. Gilchrist (1872–1931), New York State Senate
Fred C. Gilchrist (1868–1950), Iowa State Senate